The Kingsbury Breweries Company was founded in 1847, at which time it was the Kunz & Bleser Brewing Company. The main location was Manitowoc, Wisconsin, with other locations in Sheboygan, Wisconsin and St. Paul, Minnesota.  In 1926, the firm was sold to the Manitowoc Products Company and was known as the Gutsch Brewery. 

Its corporate name was changed to Kingsbury Breweries Company in 1933. The Kingsbury name and label originated during the Depression as a near-beer because of the ban on alcohol during Prohibition.  Following the end of Prohibition, the brewery was issued U-Permit No. WIS-U-734, allowing the resumption of brewing operations.  In 1933, Kingsbury Pale and Kingsbury Ale began to be produced. Kingsbury's franchise brand was known as the "Aristocrat of Beer" and "Fit for a King."  

Kingsbury's main offices remained in Manitowoc until 1963, when it merged with G. Heileman Brewing Company, which brewed and distributed Kingsbury label products until 1974.

The Geo. Wiedemann Brewing Company of Newport, Kentucky, brewed and sold Kingsbury Beer and Kingsbury Near Beer  between 1967 and  1983.  The Sioux City Brewing Company of Sioux City, Iowa, brewed and sold Kingsbury Beer from 1959 to 1960.  The Stroh Brewery Company later, after it bought the G. Heileman Brewing Company, brewed and distributed some Kingsbury labels.  Stroh's ceased operation in 1999-2000, and the Miller Brewing Company bought the Kingsbury Near Beer label, which is still brewed and distributed by Miller.

Products
Old Type Beer, 1934–1935
Kingsbury Holiday Bock, 1934–1961
Kingsbury Bock, 1934–1970
Kingsbury Beer, 1934–1973
Kingsbury Pale Near Beer, 1935–1940
Kingsbury Export Beer, 1935–1942
Kingsbury Brew Near Beer, 1938–1972
Diamond G Ale, 1939–1941
Zing Near Beer, 1958–1972
Reidenbach Beer, 1963–1968

See also
 List of defunct breweries in the United States

Notes

Defunct brewery companies of the United States
Sheboygan, Wisconsin
Defunct companies based in Wisconsin